Three Identical Strangers is a 2018 documentary film directed by Tim Wardle, about the lives of Edward Galland, David Kellman, and Robert Shafran, a set of identical triplet brothers adopted as infants by separate families. Combining archival footage, re-enacted scenes, and present-day interviews, it recounts how the triplet brothers discovered one another by chance in New York in 1980 at age 19, their public and private lives in the years that followed, and their eventual discovery that their adoption had been part of an undisclosed scientific "nature versus nurture" study of the development of genetically identical siblings raised in differing socioeconomic circumstances.

The film premiered at the 2018 Sundance Film Festival, where it won the U.S. Documentary Special Jury Award for Storytelling. The film was a nominee in the Best Documentary category at the 72nd British Academy Film Awards. It was also on the shortlist of 15 films considered for the Academy Award for Best Documentary Feature, out of 166 candidates. In the same year the film was presented at the Rome Film Fest.

Synopsis
The film describes how Robert Shafran discovered that he had a twin brother when he arrived on the campus of a New York community college and was constantly greeted by students and staff who incorrectly recognized him as Eddy Galland. The two eventually met and, finding out both had been adopted, quickly concluded that they were twins. Months later, the publicity of this human-interest story reached David Kellman, whose resemblance and matching adoption circumstances indicated that the three were actually identical triplets.

The triplet brothers found themselves alike in many ways and celebrated their newfound brotherhood. They had the same taste in food, smoked the same brand of cigarettes, all wrestled in high school, and showed signs of separation anxiety as children. They quickly became a minor media sensation, appearing on talk shows such as the popular Phil Donahue Show. They moved in together and opened a restaurant called Triplets, which they operated together. 

The triplet brothers had been involved as children in a study by psychiatrists Peter B. Neubauer and Viola W. Bernard, under the auspices of the Jewish Board of Guardians, which involved periodic visits and evaluations of the boys, the full intent of which was never explained to the adoptive parents. Following the revelation that the boys were triplets, the parents sought more information from the Louise Wise adoption agency, which claimed that they had separated the boys because of the difficulty of placing triplets in a single household. But upon further investigation, it was revealed that the infants had been intentionally separated and placed with families having different parenting styles and economic levels – one blue-collar, one middle-class, and one affluent – as an experiment on human subjects. They, and other sets of twins involved in the study, were also chosen because their parents had reported signs of mental illness prior to having children.

Over time, however, differences between the three men became apparent, and their relationships with others experienced difficulties. All three had struggled with mental health problems for years, and Galland died by suicide in 1995 following a diagnosis with “manic depressive disorder.” 

The results of the experiment have never been disclosed by the adoption agency or the psychiatric team. However, it is known that among the sets of children separated from their siblings, many have since committed suicide.

Reception
The website's critical consensus reads: "Surreal and surprising, Three Identical Strangers effectively questions the nature of reality and identity." On Metacritic, the film has a weighted average score of 81 out of 100, based on 30 critics, indicating "universal acclaim".

Related works
The Neubauer twin experiment was first publicized in a 1995 New Yorker article by investigative journalist Lawrence Wright, who appears in the film. The same, never-published twin study was the subject of the 2007 memoir Identical Strangers written by Elyse Schein and Paula Bernstein (who also appear in the film) and the subject of the 2017 documentary The Twinning Reaction, followed by the 2018 television episode Secret Siblings. The studios Raw TV, Film4 Productions, and Sidney Kimmel Entertainment are jointly developing a dramatic feature version of Three Identical Strangers, with the documentary's director Tim Wardle as an executive producer.

See also

 2018 in film
 List of documentary films

References

External links
 
 
 
 

2018 films
2018 documentary films
British documentary films
CNN Films films
Neon (distributor) films
Documentary films about adoption
Documentary films about Jews and Judaism in the United States
Documentary films about suicide
Adoption in the United States
Human subject research in psychiatry
Human subject research in the United States
Triplets
Twin studies
2010s English-language films
2010s American films
2010s British films